Clepsis oblimatana is a species of moth of the family Tortricidae. It is found in Libya, Syria, Jordan and Palestine.

References

Moths described in 1901
Clepsis